Whitman Bennett (1883–1968) was an American film producer and director of the silent era.

Selected filmography
 The Truth About Husbands (1920)
 The Devil's Garden (1920)
 The Master Mind (1920)
 Salvation Nell (1921)
 Wife Against Wife (1921)
 The Iron Trail (1921)
 Not Guilty (1921)
 The Great Adventure (1921)
 Jim the Penman (1921)
The Darling of the Rich  (1922)
 The Secrets of Paris (1922)
 How Women Love (1922)
 Fair Lady (1922)
 Modern Marriage (1923)
 Loyal Lives (1923)
 The Leavenworth Case (1923)
 Love of Women (1924)
 Virtuous Liars (1924)
 Two Shall Be Born (1924)
 The Hoosier Schoolmaster (1924)
 Back to Life (1925)
 Children of the Whirlwind (1925)
 Share and Share Alike (1925)
 Lena Rivers (1925)
 A Man of Iron (1925)
 Scandal Street (1925)

References

Bibliography
 Munden, Kenneth White. The American Film Institute Catalog of Motion Pictures Produced in the United States, Part 1. University of California Press, 1997.

External links

1883 births
1968 deaths
American film directors
American film producers
People from Cambridge, Massachusetts